Sir Harold Edgar Yarrow, 2nd Baronet, CBE FRS FRSE (11 August 1884 – 19 April 1962) was a British industrialist and shipbuilder. He developed Yarrow Shipbuilders as Chairman and Managing Director, as well as later serving as Chairman of Clydesdale Bank.

Life
He was born on 11 August 1884 in London the first surviving son of Sir Alfred Yarrow 1st Bt, an English shipbuilder and founder of the shipping dynasty Yarrow Shipbuilders, and his wife, Minnie Florence Franklin.

He was educated at Bedford School. He succeeded as 2nd baronet upon his father's death in 1932.

Yarrow was chairman and managing director of Yarrow Shipbuilders for over forty years, diversifying the company and overseeing its move to the River Clyde.

He served as Chairman of the North of Scotland and Clydesdale Bank and, having been appointed a Commander of the Order of the British Empire (CBE) in the 1918 New Year Honours, he was promoted to Knight Grand Cross (GBE) in the 1958 New Year Honours, for advancing Scottish business interests.

He served two terms as President of the Institution of Engineers and Shipbuilders in Scotland, from 1921–23 and from 1956-57.

Sir Harold died at Overton, Kilmacolm, Renfrewshire on 19 April 1962, when he was succeeded by Eric Yarrow, his only son.

Arms

References

1884 births
1962 deaths
British Jews
People educated at Bedford School
British industrialists
Baronets in the Baronetage of the United Kingdom
Knights Grand Cross of the Order of the British Empire
Presidents of the Institution of Engineers and Shipbuilders in Scotland
20th-century Scottish businesspeople